"It's a Matter of Time'" is a song written by Clive Westlake and recorded in 1972 by Elvis Presley.

It was recorded by him during the March 27–29, 1972 recording session at the RCA Studios in Nashville.

The song was first released in August 1972 as a B-side to "Burning Love" and then in November on the album Burning Love and Hits from His Movies, Volume 2.

Critical response 
Billboard in its August 12, 1972 issue  put the single "Burning Love / It's a Matter of Time" on the recommended list (New Radio Action Billboard Pick Singles, section "Pop").

Reception 
While the A-side ("Burning Love") made it to number two on the Hot 100, the flip side ("It's a Matter of Time") charted both on the Billboard Easy Listening and Hot Country Singles charts.

"Burning Love / It's a Matter of Time" became the last Elvis Presley's single to be certified platinum.

Charts 

 * as "It's a Matter of Time"
 * as "It's a Matter of Time / Burning Love"

References 

1972 songs
1972 singles
Elvis Presley songs
RCA Records singles
Songs written by Clive Westlake